The 1941 Edinburgh West by-election was a by-election in the Edinburgh West constituency that occurred on 12 July 1941.

Ian Clark Hutchison stood for the Unionist Party.  As he faced no opposition, he was declared elected.  It remains the last uncontested by-election in Scotland to date.

References

1941 elections in the United Kingdom
1941 in Scotland
1940s elections in Scotland
West, 1941
Unopposed by-elections to the Parliament of the United Kingdom in Scottish constituencies
1940s in Edinburgh
July 1941 events